Esko Hillebrandt (born 20 April 1962) is a Finnish rower. He competed in the men's double sculls event at the 1992 Summer Olympics.

References

External links
 

1962 births
Living people
Finnish male rowers
Olympic rowers of Finland
Rowers at the 1992 Summer Olympics
People from Imatra
Sportspeople from South Karelia